Andrew Herring (born May 5, 1987) is an American professional stock car racing driver, test driver, and spotter. He works for Toyota Racing Development and Joe Gibbs Racing as a test driver, and is also the spotter for Martin Truex Jr. and JGR's No. 19 team in the NASCAR Cup Series. As a driver, Herring last competed part-time in the Cup Series, driving the No. 96 Toyota Camry for Gaunt Brothers Racing. He also has driven in the NASCAR Xfinity and Truck Series and the ARCA Menards Series in the past.

Racing career

Driving career

Early career
Herring launched into his career in 2006 when he captured the Late Model Championship at South Boston Speedway with nine wins in 17 starts. In the next year, he collected his second Late Model championship at Southern National Raceway Park with seven wins and 21 top-five finishes in 29 races.

In 2008, he participated in the USAR Pro Cup Series where he scored Rookie of the Year honors, with two top-five and seven top-10 finishes in 14 starts. Herring continue in the USAR Pro Cup Series in 2009 as he earned his first series win at South Georgia Motorsports Park. He closed the season with seven top-five finishes and nine top-10 finishes in 14 starts, finishing third in the USAR Pro Cup Series Championship and fifth in the regular season points standings. Also, Herring participated in two ARCA Racing Series races to his schedule for RBR Enterprises and posted top-20 finishes in both of his series starts.

Camping World Truck Series
In 2012, he made his only NASCAR Camping World Truck Series start for Kyle Busch Motorsports at Iowa Speedway in September, and finished seventh.

Xfinity Series

In 2010, Herring made his debut in the Nationwide Series at Iowa Speedway for Baker-Curb Racing, and finished 15th; posting two top-20 finishes in four series starts for the team. The next year, Herring joined Joe Gibbs Racing for four races (two Iowa races, Nashville, and IRP). He collected two top-10 finishes and led 39 laps. His 7th place in Nashville, was his best result. In 2012 he picked up his first career top 5 finish in the Nationwide Series, at Kentucky Speedway in September, finishing fourth.

For the 2013 season, Herring ran six races for JGR, posting two sixth-place finishes and had only one DNF due to a crash at Bristol Motor Speedway. After not running any races in 2014, he qualified as a stand-in for JGR twice in 2015, but did not run a single race. At the same time, Herring became a Toyota Racing Development test driver, often testing experimental setups for NASCAR Cup Series cars.

Cup Series
In November 2019, Herring joined Gaunt Brothers Racing for his only cup start in the 2019 Ford EcoBoost 400 at Homestead–Miami Speedway, driving the No. 96 with a special paint scheme celebrating TRD's 40th anniversary. His start later became notable due to race manipulation scheme meant to prevent his team from winning the owner's championship for the highest placed non-charter team.

Spotting career
On December 6, 2020, it was revealed that Herring would become the new spotter for Joe Gibbs Racing's No. 19 of Martin Truex Jr. in the Cup Series starting in 2021. He replaced Clayton Hughes, who left JGR for Front Row Motorsports to be the spotter for the No. 34 of Michael McDowell after the retirement of McDowell's previous spotter Rocky Ryan.

Motorsports career results

NASCAR
(key) (Bold – Pole position awarded by qualifying time. Italics – Pole position earned by points standings or practice time. * – Most laps led.)

Monster Energy Cup Series

Xfinity Series

Camping World Truck Series

ARCA Racing Series
(key) (Bold – Pole position awarded by qualifying time. Italics – Pole position earned by points standings or practice time. * – Most laps led.)

 Ineligible for series points

References

External links
 
 

Living people
1987 births
People from Benson, North Carolina
Racing drivers from North Carolina
NASCAR drivers
CARS Tour drivers
ARCA Menards Series drivers
Joe Gibbs Racing drivers
Kyle Busch Motorsports drivers